Badara Sène may refer to:
 Badara Sène (footballer)
 Badara Sène (referee)